Carolina Uccelli (1810–1885) was an Italian composer known for opera.

Biography
Carolina Uccelli (Pazzini) was born in Florence and made her debut as a composer with the performance of the sacred opera Saul at the Teatro della Pergola on 21 June 1830. Uccelli wrote both libretto and music for the opera. A two-act melodrama Anna di Resburo with libretto by Gaetano Rossi was performed in Naples in 1832. The overture of her opera Eufemio da Messina was performed in Milan in 1833.

Uccelli's husband died in 1843, and she moved to Paris with her daughter Giulia. The two women performed concert tours in Belgium, the Netherlands and Switzerland. Uccelli died in Paris in 1885.

Works

Saul 1830 opera
Anna di Resburgo 1832 opera
Eufemio da Messina 1833 opera
Sulla morte di Maria Malibran cantata for chorus and orchestra
Quattro ariette e due cavatine for voice and keyboard, printed, Milan 1827

References

Italian women classical composers
Italian opera composers
1810 births
1885 deaths
Women opera composers
Italian classical composers
19th-century classical composers
19th-century Italian composers
19th-century Italian women
19th-century women composers